The J Award of 2012 is the eighth annual J Awards, established by the Australian Broadcasting Corporation's youth-focused radio station Triple J. The announcement comes at the culmination of Ausmusic Month (November). For the fifth year, three awards were presented; Australian Album of the Year, Australian Music Video of the Year and Unearthed Artist of the Year. Winners were announced on 23 November 2012.

Who's eligible? 
Any Australian album released independently or through a record company, or sent to Triple J in consideration for airplay, is eligible for the J Award. The 2012 nominations for Australian Album of the Year and Australian Music Video of the Year were selected from releases received by Triple J between November 2011 and October 2012. For Unearthed Artist of the Year it was open to any artist from the Unearthed (talent contest), who has had a ground breaking and impactful 12 months from November 2011 and October 2012.

Awards

Australian Album of the Year

This was the second time Tame Impala have won this award; the first coming at the J Awards of 2010 with Innerspeaker.

Australian Video of the Year

Unearthed Artist of the Year

References

2012 in Australian music
2012 music awards
J Awards